Bruce Ayshford is an Australian former professional rugby league footballer who played professionally Eastern Suburbs Roosters. Ayshford played in the NSWRFL premiership, where he was Rooster number #591.

Bruce Ayshford is the uncle of the rugby league footballer; Blake Ayshford.

References

Living people
Australian rugby league players
Rugby league players from Sydney
Sydney Roosters players
Place of birth missing (living people)
Year of birth missing (living people)